The Samaritan High Priest is the high priest (kohen gadol) of the Samaritan community in the Levant. According to Samaritan tradition, the office has existed continuously since the time of Aaron, the brother of Moses, and has been held by 133 priests over the last 3400 years. However, the historicity of this claim is disputed. One account by Josephus suggests that its office holders are an offshoot of the Zadokite high priests of Jerusalem from around the time of Alexander the Great. , the incumbent high priest is Abdel IV.

Office of the High Priest

Duties and responsibilities 
The Samaritan High Priest has the following duties in the present:

 He decides all religious law issues.
 He presides over the religious ceremonies on Mount Garizim.
 He validates all marriages and divorces within the Samaritan community.
 He annually publishes the liturgical calendar of the Samaritans.
 He confirms a joining of the Samaritan community.
 He appoints the Cantors and the Shechita of the community.
 He represents the Samaritan community to the outside world.

Lineage 
Since 1623/24, the office of high priest has been passed down in a family traced back to Aaron's grandson Itamar. After the death of a high priest, the office passes to the oldest male in that family, unless he has entered into a marriage that disqualifies him from the high priesthood.

It appears, based upon the larger gaps in time between high priests, that several names might be missing, or that there were long periods of vacancy between priests.

The continuous lineage of Samaritan High Priests, descending directly from Aaron, through his son Eleazar, and his son Phinehas, was however disrupted in the early 17th century. In 1624, Shalma I ben Phinehas, the last Samaritan High Priest of the line of Eleazar son of Aaron died without male succession, but descendants of Aaron's other son, Ithamar, remained and took over the office.

There are four families within the house of Ithamar. The Åbtå order, descended from the 113th High Priest Tsedaka ben Tabia, which has held the office of the High Priesthood since 1624; the House of Phineas a.k.a. Dār 'Åder, descended from Fīn'ās ban Yīṣ'å̄q (Phineas ben Isaac); Dār Yīṣ'å̄q, descended from Yīṣ'å̄q ban Åmrām (Isaac ben Amram); and Dār Yāqob, descended from Yāqob ban Årron (Jacob ben Aaron).

List of Samaritan High Priests

Pummer's list 
The following list gives the names and terms of office according to Reinhard Pummer. Pummer uses a spelling for the name of the high priest that is based on the English Bible for the bearers of biblical names, while he chooses a more scientific transcription for the full name (last column). The traditional counting begins with the first post-biblical high priest Sheshai. It differs in order in some cases from the list prepared by Moses Gaster and Reinhard Pummer on the basis of the ancient Samaritan sources, and includes additional names (italics here).

Moses Gaster's list
Moses Gaster, in his 1909 article The Chain of Samaritan High Priests: A Synchronistic Synopsis: Published for the First Time, published a slightly different order which he translated from two codices written by the High Priests:
 Sashai I
 Bakhi I
 Uzzi
 Sashai II
 Bakhi II
 Shembet
 Shalom I
 Hezekiah I
 Jonathan I
 Daliah I
 Jair II
 Jonathan II
 Ishmael
 Tabia I
 Zadok, #16—19 in the above list are evidently omitted
 Amram I
 Hilkiah, Hezekiah in the above list
 Amram II
 Akkub
 Akkubiah
 Hillel I
 Seriah
 Levi I
 Netaniel I
 Azariah
 Aabed-El I
 Hezekiah II(I)
 Hananiah
 Amram III
 Hana, Hillel II in the above list
 Hezekiah III(IV)
 Daliah II
 Akkub II
 Akkubiah II
 Levi II
 Eleazar II
 Manasseh
 Jair IV
 Netaniel II
 Joachim
 Jonathan III
 Elishama
 Shemaiah
 Tabia II
 Amram IV
 Akabon I
 Phinehas II
 Levi III
 Eleazar III
 Baba I
 Eleazar IV
 Akabon II
 Netaniel III
Akabon III, see #60 in the above list
Netaniel IV
Akabon IV
Eleazar V
Akabon V
Eleazar VI
Akabon VI
Eleazar VII
Netaniel V
Eleazar VIII
Netaniel VI
Eleazar IX
Akabon VII
Eleazar X
Akabon VIII
Eleazar XI
Akabon IX
Eleazar XII
Simeon
Levi IV
Phinehas III
Netaniel VII
Baba II(I)
Eleazar XIII
Netaniel VIII
Eleazar XIV
Phinehas IV
Netaniel IX
Aabed-El II
Eleazar XV
Aabed-El III
Eleazar XVI
Aaharon II, see #93 on the above list
Tsedaka I, see #94 on the above list
Amram V
Aaharon III
Amram VI
Aaharon IV
Netaniel X
Itamar I
Amram VI(I), see #98 on the above list
Uzzi II, see #99 on the above list
Yoseph I, see #100 on the above list
Phinehas V, see #101 on the above list
Eleazar XVII
Phinehas VI
Abisha II
Eleazar XVIII
Phinehas VII
Eleazar XIX, see #110 on the above list
Phinehas IX
 (1613–1624) Shalma I
 (1624–1650) Tsedaka II
 (1650–1694) Yitzhaq I
 (1694–1732) Abram
 (1732–1752) Levi V
 (1752–1787) Tabia III
 (1787–1855) Shalma II
 (1855–1874) Amram VIII
 (1874–1916) Yaacob I

See also
 Kohanim
 Chief Rabbi
 Rishamma

References

Samaritan high priests
Religious leadership roles